Jawand (also romanized as Javand) is a town and the capital of Jawand District, in Badghis Province,  Afghanistan.

External links
Satellite map at Maplandia.com

Populated places in Badghis Province